Jon-Hermann Hegg (born 26 March 1999) is a Norwegian sport shooter, born in  Dingle, Ireland. He represented Norway at the 2020 Summer Olympics in Tokyo 2021, competing in men's 10 m air rifle and in 50 metre rifle three positions.

At the 2022 European 25/50 m Events Championships, he won a gold medal in 50m rifle 3 positions mixed team, together with Jeanette Hegg Duestad.

Records

References

External links
 
 
 

 

1999 births
Living people
People from  Dingle
Norwegian male sport shooters
Shooters at the 2020 Summer Olympics
Olympic shooters of Norway
21st-century Norwegian people